The  doubles Tournament at the 2005 Banka Koper Slovenia Open took place in mid-September on outdoor hard courts in Portorož, Slovenia.

Anabel Medina Garrigues and Roberta Vinci emerged as the winners.

Seeds

  Yuliya Beygelzimer /  Janette Husárová (semifinals)
  Jelena Kostanić /  Katarina Srebotnik (final)
  Květa Peschke /  Meilen Tu (quarterfinals)
  Anabel Medina Garrigues /  Roberta Vinci (winners)

Draw

Results

References

2005 Doubles
Banka Koper Slovenia Open - Doubles